Core lock is a jet engine failure that can happen to aircraft in flight. When an engine is shut down in flight, the design of the engine causes some parts to cool quicker than others. Since materials change sizes in different temperatures, this happens to the jet engine. If the engine's parts sizes differ too much, then some parts will grip onto other parts, reducing or even stopping rotation. This condition is called "core lock."

Core lock makes it difficult for pilots to perform either a windmill restart or an APU-assisted engine restart.

When the engine parts’ temperature is allowed to normalize, after time is given, the parts will normalize in sizes, removing the core lock condition.

Pinnacle Airlines Flight 3701 

Core lock was cited as one of the contributing causes to the October 2004 Pinnacle Airlines Flight 3701 accident, noting that the primary cause, the pilots' "unprofessional ... deviation from standard operating procedures" causing both engines to shut down, was exacerbated by:

References 

 NTSB Synopsis 
 Air Line Pilots Association (ALPA) 
 Popular Mechanics What Went Wrong: The Crash Of Flight 3701 

Aviation risks
Jet engines